Newton Booth Tarkington (July 29, 1869 – May 19, 1946) was an American novelist and dramatist best known for his novels The Magnificent Ambersons (1918) and Alice Adams (1921). He is one of only four novelists to win the Pulitzer Prize for Fiction more than once, along with William Faulkner, John Updike, and Colson Whitehead. In the 1910s and 1920s he was considered the United States' greatest living author. Several of his stories were adapted to film.

During the first quarter of the 20th century, Tarkington, along with Meredith Nicholson, George Ade, and James Whitcomb Riley helped to create a Golden Age of literature in Indiana.

Booth Tarkington served one term in the Indiana House of Representatives, was critical of the advent of automobiles, and set many of his stories in the Midwest. He eventually removed to Kennebunkport, Maine, where he continued his life work even as he suffered a loss of vision.

Biography
Tarkington was born in Indianapolis, Indiana, the son of John S. Tarkington and Elizabeth Booth Tarkington. He was named after his maternal uncle Newton Booth, then the governor of California. He was also related to Chicago Mayor James Hutchinson Woodworth through Woodworth's wife Almyra Booth Woodworth.

Tarkington attended Shortridge High School in Indianapolis, and completed his secondary education at Phillips Exeter Academy, a boarding school on the East Coast. He attended Purdue University for two years, where he was a member of the Sigma Chi Fraternity and the university's Morley Eating Club. He later made substantial donations to Purdue for building an all-men's residence hall, which the university named Tarkington Hall in his honor. Purdue awarded him an honorary doctorate.

College years

Some of his family's wealth returned after the Panic of 1873, and his mother transferred Booth from Purdue to Princeton University. At Princeton, Tarkington is said to have been known as "Tark" among the members of the Ivy Club, the first of Princeton's historic Eating Clubs. He had also been in a short-lived eating club called "Ye Plug and Ulster," which became Colonial Club. He was active as an actor and served as president of Princeton's Dramatic Association, which later became the Triangle Club, of which he was a founding member according to Triangle's official history.

Tarkington made his first acting appearance in the club's Shakespearean spoof Katherine, one of the first three productions in the Triangle's history written and produced by students. Tarkington established the Triangle tradition, still alive today, of producing students' plays. Tarkington returned to the Triangle stage as Cassius in the 1893 production of a play he co-authored, The Honorable Julius Caesar. He edited Princeton's Nassau Literary Magazine, known more recently as The Nassau Lit. While an undergraduate, he socialized with Woodrow Wilson, an associate graduate member of the Ivy Club. Wilson returned to Princeton as a member of the political science faculty shortly before Tarkington departed; they maintained contact throughout Wilson's life. Tarkington failed to earn his undergraduate A.B. because of missing a single course in the classics. Nevertheless, his place within campus society was already determined, and he was voted "most popular" by the class of 1893.

Awards and recognition
In his adult life, he was twice asked to return to Princeton for the conferral of honorary degrees, an A.M. in 1899 and a Litt.D. in 1918. Tarkington is the only alumnus to have been awarded more than one honorary degree by Princeton University.

While Tarkington never earned a college degree, he was accorded many awards recognizing and honoring his skills and accomplishments as an author. He won the Pulitzer Prize in fiction twice, in 1919 and 1922, for his novels The Magnificent Ambersons and Alice Adams. In 1921 booksellers rated him "the most significant contemporary American author" in a poll conducted by Publishers' Weekly. He won the O. Henry Memorial Award in 1931 for his short story "Cider of Normandy". His works appeared frequently on best sellers lists throughout his life. In addition to his honorary doctorate from Purdue, and his honorary masters and doctorate from Princeton, Tarkington was awarded an honorary doctorate from Columbia University, the administrator of the Pulitzer Prize, and several other universities.

Many aspects of Tarkington's Princeton years and adult life were paralleled by the later life of another writer, fellow Princetonian F. Scott Fitzgerald.

Tarkington as "The Midwesterner"

Tarkington was an unabashed Midwestern regionalist and set much of his fiction in his native Indiana. In 1902, he served one term in the Indiana House of Representatives as a Republican. Tarkington saw such public service as a responsibility of gentlemen in his socio-economic class, and consistent with his family's extensive record of public service. This experience provided the foundation for his book In the Arena: Stories of Political Life. While his service as an Indiana legislator was his only official public service position, he remained politically conservative his entire life. He supported Prohibition, opposed FDR, and worked against FDR's New Deal.

Tarkington was one of the more popular American novelists of his time. His The Two Vanrevels and Mary's Neck appeared on the annual best-seller lists a total of nine times. The Penrod novels depict a typical upper-middle class American boy of 1910 vintage, revealing a fine, bookish sense of American humor. At one time, his Penrod series was as well known as Huckleberry Finn by Mark Twain. Much of Tarkington's work consists of satirical and closely observed studies of the American class system and its foibles. He himself came from a patrician Midwestern family that lost much of its wealth after the Panic of 1873. Today, he is best known for his novel The Magnificent Ambersons, which Orson Welles filmed in 1942. It is included in the Modern Library's list of top-100 novels. The second volume in Tarkington's Growth trilogy, it contrasted the decline of the "old money" Amberson dynasty with the rise of "new money" industrial tycoons in the years between the American Civil War and World War I.

Tarkington dramatized several of his novels; some were eventually filmed including Monsieur Beaucaire, Presenting Lily Mars, and The Adventures and Emotions of Edgar Pomeroy, made into a serialized film in 1920 and 1921. He also collaborated with Harry Leon Wilson to write three plays. In 1928, he published a book of reminiscences, The World Does Move. He illustrated the books of others, including a 1933 reprint of Adventures of Huckleberry Finn, as well as his own. He took a close interest in fine art and collectibles, and was a trustee of the John Herron Art Institute.

Tarkington was married to Louisa Fletcher from 1902 until their divorce in 1911. Their only child, Laurel, was born in 1906 and died in 1923. He married Susanah Keifer Robinson in 1912. They had no children.

Tarkington began losing his eyesight in the 1920s. He continued producing his works by dictating to his secretary Elizabeth Trotter. Despite his failing eyesight, between 1928 and 1940 he edited several historical novels by his Kennebunkport, Maine, neighbor Kenneth Roberts, who described Tarkington as a "co-author" of his later books and dedicated three of them (Rabble in Arms, Northwest Passage, and Oliver Wiswell) to him.

Tarkington underwent eye surgery in February 1929. In August 1930, he suffered a complete loss in his eyesight and was rushed from Maine to Baltimore for surgery on his right eye. He had an additional two operations in the latter half of 1930. In 1931, after five months of blindness, he underwent a fifth and final operation. The surgery resulted in a significant restoration in Tarkington's eyesight. However, his physical energy was diminished for the remainder of his life.

Tarkington maintained a home in his native Indiana at 4270 North Meridian in Indianapolis. From 1923 until his death, Tarkington spent summers and then much of his later life in Kennebunkport at his much loved home, Seawood. In Kennebunkport he was well known as a sailor, and his schooner, the Regina, survived him. Regina was moored next to Tarkington's boathouse, The Floats which he also used as his studio. His extensively renovated studio is now the Kennebunkport Maritime Museum. It was from his home in Maine that he and his wife Susannah established their relation with nearby Colby College.

Tarkington made a gift of some his papers to Princeton University, his alma mater, and his wife Susannah, who survived him by over 20 years, made a separate gift of his remaining papers to Colby College after his death. Purdue University's library holds many of his works in its Special Collection's Indiana Collection. Indianapolis commemorates his impact on literature and the theatre, and his contributions as a Midwesterner and "son of Indiana" in its Booth Tarkington Civic Theatre. He is buried in Crown Hill Cemetery in Indianapolis.

Legacy

In the 1910s and 1920s, Tarkington was regarded as the great American novelist, as important as Mark Twain. His works were reprinted many times, were often on best-seller lists, won many prizes, and were adapted into other media. Penrod and its two sequels were regular birthday presents for bookish boys. By the later twentieth century, however, he was ignored in academia: no congresses, no society, no journal of Tarkington Studies. In 1985 he was cited as an example of the great discrepancy possible between an author's fame when alive and oblivion later. According to this view, if an author succeeds at pleasing his or her contemporaries — and Tarkington's works have not a whiff of social criticism — he or she is not going to please later readers of inevitably different values and concerns.

In an essay titled "Hoosiers: The Lost World of Booth Tarkington", appearing in the May 2004 issue of The Atlantic, Thomas Mallon wrote of Tarkington that "only general ignorance of his work has kept him from being pressed into contemporary service as a literary environmentalist — not just a 'conservationist,' in the TR mode, but an emerald-Green decrier of internal combustion":
The automobile, whose production was centered in Indianapolis before World War I, became the snorting, belching villain that, along with soft coal, laid waste to Tarkington's Edens. His objections to the auto were aesthetic—in The Midlander (1923) automobiles sweep away the more beautifully named "phaetons" and "surreys"—but also something far beyond that. Dreiser, his exact Indiana contemporary, might look at the Model T and see wage slaves in need of unions and sit-down strikes; Tarkington saw pollution, and a filthy tampering with human nature itself. "No one could have dreamed that our town was to be utterly destroyed," he wrote in The World Does Move. His important novels are all marked by the soul-killing effects of smoke and asphalt and speed, and even in Seventeen, Willie Baxter fantasizes about winning Miss Pratt by the rescue of precious little Flopit from an automobile's rushing wheels.

In an essay titled "The Rise and Fall of Booth Tarkington", appearing in the November 11, 2019 issue of The New Yorker, Robert Gottlieb wrote that Tarkington "dwindled into America's most distinguished hack." Gottlieb criticized Tarkington's anti-modernist perspective, "his deeply rooted, unappeasable need to look longingly backward, an impulse that goes beyond nostalgia" for preventing him from "producing so little of real substance."

In June 2019, the Library of America published Booth Tarkington: Novels & Stories, collecting The Magnificent Ambersons, Alice Adams, and In the Arena: Stories of Political Life.

Works

Trilogies

Penrod
 1914: Penrod
 1916: Penrod and Sam
 1929: Penrod Jashber

Two film musicals were loosely based on the  Penrod series, On Moonlight Bay  (1951) and its sequel, By the Light of the Silvery Moon (1954), with Doris Day and Gordon MacRae.

Growth
 1915: The Turmoil
 1918: The Magnificent AmbersonsWinner of the 1919 Pulitzer PrizeAdapted for a 1942 film by Orson Welles and a 2002 television movie
 1923: The Midlander (re-titled National Avenue in 1927)

Novels
 1899: The Gentleman from Indiana
 1900: Monsieur BeaucaireLater adapted as a play, an operetta and two films: 1924 and 1946
 1901: Old Grey Eagle
 1903: CherrySerialized in Harper's Magazine, January and February 1901
 1902: The Two Vanrevels (1902)
 1905: The Beautiful Lady
 1905: The Conquest of Canaan
 1907: The Guest of Quesnay
 1907: His Own People
 1909: Beasley's Christmas Party
 1912: Beauty and the Jacobin, an Interlude of the French Revolution
 1913: The Flirt, adapted for The Flirt (1922 film)
 1916: Seventeen
 1916: The Spring Concert
 1917: The Rich Man's War
 1919: Ramsey Milholland
 1921: Alice AdamsWinner of the 1922 Pulitzer Prize Adapted for film in 1923 and 1935
 1922: Gentle JuliaFilmed in 1923 and 1936
 1925: Women
 1927: The Plutocrat
 1928: Claire Ambler
 1928: The World Does Move
 1930: Mirthful Haven
 1932: Mary's Neck
 1933: Presenting Lily MarsAdapted for film in 1943
 1934: Rumbin Galleries (romantic novel)
 1934: Little Orvie
 1936: Horse and Buggy DaysAppeared in Cosmopolitan, September 1936
 1936: The Lorenzo Bunch
 1941: The Fighting Littles
 1941: The Heritage of Hatcher Ide
 1943: Kate Fennigate
 1945: Image of Josephine
 1947: The Show Piece (posthumously published)

Short story collections 
 In the Arena: Stories of Political Life (1905)
 The Fascinating Stranger and Other Stories (1923)

Short stories
 1919: War Stories (one of Tarkington's stories was included in this anthology)
 Miss Rennsdale Accepts )19__)

Collections
 1904: Poe's Run: and other poems … to which is appended the book of the chronicles of the Elis (co-author, with M'Cready Sykes)
 1921: Harlequin and Columbine

Non-fiction
What the Victory or Defeat of Germany Means to Every American (1917)
 1926: Looking Forward, and OthersContains "Looking Forward to the Great Adventure", "Nipskillions", "The Hopeful Pessimist", "Stars in the Dust-heap", "The Golden Age" and "Happiness Now"
 The Collector's Whatnot (1923)
 Just Princeton (1924)
 The World Does Move (1929)
 1939: Some Old Portraits (essays on 17th century artworks)
 What We've Got to Do (1942)
 Booth Tarkington On Dogs (1944)
 Your Amiable Uncle (1949)
 On Plays, Playwrights, and Playgoers (1959)

Plays
 1908: The Man from Home (stage play co-written with Harry Leon Wilson)
 1910: Your Humble Servant (stage play co-written with Harry Leon Wilson)
 1917: Mister Antonic (stage play)
 1919: The Gibson Upright (stage play co-written with Harry Leon Wilson)
 1919: Clarence: A Comedy in Four Acts (stage play)
 1921: The Country Cousins: A Comedy in Four Acts (stage play)
 1921: The Intimate Strangers: A Comedy in Three Acts (stage play)
 1922: The Wren: A Comedy in Three Acts (stage play)
 1922: The Ghost Story (stage play)
 1923: The Trysting Place (stage play)
 1926: Bimbo the Pirate (stage play)
 1927: Station YYYY (stage play)
 1927: The Travellers (stage play)
 1930: How's Your Health? A Comedy in Three Acts (stage play)
 1935: Mister Antonio: A Play in Four Acts (stage play)
 1945: Lady Hamilton and Her Nelson (radio play, written in 1940)

References

External links

 

PoliticalGraveyard.com entry

Biography from Colby College collection of his papers

 Booth Tarkington at Fantastic Fiction
  The Judy Room "Presenting Lily Mars" Section.
 Booth Tarkington Civic Theatre
 
 Finding aid to Booth Tarkington papers at Columbia University. Rare Book & Manuscript Library.
 Booth Tarkington Collection at the Harry Ransom Center

Online editions
 
 
 
 
 

 
1869 births
1946 deaths
19th-century American novelists
20th-century American dramatists and playwrights
20th-century American novelists
American male dramatists and playwrights
American male novelists
Burials at Crown Hill Cemetery
Novelists from Indiana
Old Right (United States)
Phillips Exeter Academy alumni
Princeton University alumni
Pulitzer Prize for the Novel winners
Purdue University alumni
Writers from Indiana
Writers from Indianapolis
Republican Party members of the Indiana House of Representatives
20th-century American male writers
Shortridge High School alumni
Indianapolis Museum of Art people
Members of the American Academy of Arts and Letters